Damion is a given name. Notable people with the name include:

 Damion Barry, Trinidadian runner
 Damion Berger, British photographer
 Damion Cook, American football player
 Damion Dietz, American filmmaker
 Damion Easley, American baseball player
 Damion Fletcher, American football player
 Damion Hall, American R&B singer
 Damion Jacobs, Jamaican cricketer
 Damion James, American basketball player
 Damion Lee, American basketball player
 Damion Lowe, Jamaican footballer
 Damion McIntosh, American football player
 Damion Poitier, American actor and stuntman
 Damion Reid, American drummer
 Damion Scott, American comic book artist and writer
 Damion Searls, American writer and translator
 Damion Stewart, Jamaican footballer
 Damion Suomi, American musician
 Damion Square, American football player
 Damion Williams, Jamaican footballer

See also
 Damian (disambiguation)
 Damien (disambiguation)